Two ships of the Royal Navy have borne the name HMS Eglinton.

  was a  launched in 1916 and sold in 1922. 
  was a  launched in 1939 and scrapped in 1956.

Royal Navy ship names